Skrynnik may refer to:

 Alexander Skrynnik (1953-1981), Moldovan serial killer
 Yelena Skrynnik (born 1961), minister of agriculture of Russian Federation in 2009-2012